The Cowboy Bebop anime series was accompanied by a number of soundtrack albums composed by Yoko Kanno and Seatbelts, a diverse band Kanno formed to create the music for the series, with a principal focus in jazz. The soundtrack was released in the American market by Victor Entertainment, a subsidiary of JVC Kenwood.

Theme songs

"Tank!"
"Tank!" is the series' opening song. The song, written by Yoko Kanno and performed by Seatbelts, has an extensive alto saxophone solo played by Masato Honda, as well as a fill part at the end. The song is a big band jazz piece in a Latin-infused hard bop style with a rhythm section that combines a double bass and bongo drums.

"Tank!" is primarily an instrumental piece, though it does feature some spoken male vocals (provided by long-time collaborator with Kanno, Tim Jensen) in the introductory portion of the song, thematically jazz in style. The vocal portion provides a lead-in to the instrumental portion, and its final lyrics, "I think it's time we blow this scene. Get everybody and the stuff together. Okay, three, two, one let's jam", signal the beginning bursts of the majority, purely instrumental end of the song.

It has been featured on the soundtracks to the series and was used on the preview for TV series My Own Worst Enemy. Figure skater Kevin Reynolds performed his short program for the 2016 Canadian National Figure Skating Championships to "Tank!", and did it dressed as Spike Spiegel.

"The Real Folk Blues"
"The Real Folk Blues" is the first ending theme for Cowboy Bebop. The song was performed by Seatbelts, featuring vocals by Mai Yamane. The song was composed and arranged by Yoko Kanno, with lyrics by Yūho Iwasato. The track appears on the series-related album . The song is one of few songs in the series to be sung in Japanese.

The song is not used for the end credits in "Jupiter Jazz, Pt. II" (the song used for the end credits in "Jupiter Jazz, Pt. II" is "Space Lion") and the finale, "The Real Folk Blues". However, an alternate version of the song entitled "See You Space Cowboy..." plays during the final episode as the prelude to the climax. It appears on the Cowboy Bebop Blue album as a bonus track.

Studio recordings

Cowboy Bebop

Cowboy Bebop is the first album created for the series, and the most easily categorized in terms of genre, as an outlet for many of the trademark bebop tracks. It begins with the show's theme song, "Tank!". The track "Bad Dog No Biscuits" opens with a cover of the Tom Waits composition "Midtown" before diverting in its interpretation.

The album received a rating of five out of five stars from AllMusic.

Cowboy Bebop Vitaminless

 is the first mini-album. It features the end credits theme from the series, "The Real Folk Blues".

The middle section of "Spy" was later reprised in "You Make Me Cool", which appears on the No Disc album.

Cowboy Bebop No Disc

 is the second soundtrack album, which has more stylistic variety than its predecessor, incorporating bluegrass music, heavy metal, Japanese pop, lounge, swing, chorale and scat-singing, among other styles, as well as the usual blues and jazz pieces.

Cowboy Bebop Blue

Cowboy Bebop Blue is the third soundtrack album, featuring many vocal pieces including a unique variation of "Ave Maria" performed by Jerzy Knetig and the Warsaw Philharmonic Orchestra.

It was released on May 1, 1999. Regarding the album, Cammila Collar of AllMusic wrote: "Of the more than ten discs released in conjunction with Cowboy Bebop, Blue is undoubtedly the best, representing the widest variety of genres."

Ask DNA 

Ask DNA is a maxi single released in 2001, an accompaniment to Cowboy Bebop Future Blues. It consists of a few highlights from Cowboy Bebop: The Movie, including the title theme, "Ask DNA".

Future Blues

Future Blues is the main soundtrack from Cowboy Bebop: The Movie. It explores styles such as country-western and Arabic music.

The song "3.14" features Aoi Tada reciting the first 53 digits of pi to a tune.

Cowboy Bebop Tank! THE! BEST!

Cowboy Bebop Tank! THE! BEST! compiles previously released material, mostly vocal pieces, with three all-new songs written for the 2005 PlayStation 2 game Cowboy Bebop: Tsuioku no Serenade, featuring the vocals of Ilaria Graziano. The first pressing of the CD included a bonus sticker. These songs were the last new material released by Seatbelts.

Miscellaneous

Cowboy Bebop Remixes: Music for Freelance

 is a collection of songs remixed by popular American and British DJs, including many from the popular Ninja Tune label. Mr. Scruff spoke to British magazine Impact of his remix of Cat Blues, telling Andrez Bergen that he chose it "as it was a great, old sounding tune, simple with loads of personality. The parts were so well recorded that it was a pleasure to remix! I chopped it up into a kind of stuttering drumbox jazz wobbler".

The premise of the album is that the CD is a recording of a pirate radio station, and each song is humorously introduced by the DJ (Watanabe), in English. These tracks are called the "Radio Free Mars Talks". They are credited as follows:

 Script: Shinichirō Watanabe, Dai Sato
 Translation: Agnes S. Kaku
 Narration: Peter Duimstra

Cowgirl Ed

Cowgirl Ed is a limited edition Mini-CD. This single came packaged with the first pressing of Future Blues and is currently out of print.

Cowboy Bebop Boxed Set

The Cowboy Bebop Boxed Set includes four regular size CDs, one bonus Mini CD, and a 52-page booklet (in Japanese). The booklet includes trivia, track listings, interviews, and lyrics. Disks 1, 2 and 3 contain new and previously released tracks from the series, performed by Seatbelts. Disk 4 contains live tracks from Seatbelts on tour, as well as some unreleased movie tracks. The dialogue tracks are not songs, rather, they are vocal samples taken directly from the Japanese version of the series. It was released on June 21, 2002, and is now out of production.

Sean Westergaard of AllMusic gave the boxed set four out of five stars, citing its eclectic blend of genres and an appeal going beyond anime fans to "any adventurous listener", but also mentioned that the spoken dialogue tracks detracted from its accessibility.

The scripts for the dialogue tracks are credited to Shinichiro Watanabe and Dai Sato and the translation was done by Agnes S. Kaku.

Tracks in bold are exclusive to this boxed set.

12" Vinyl Singles
Accompanying the release of the Cowboy Bebop Remixes: Music for Freelance album and the Ask DNA maxi-single were two EPs released on 12-inch vinyl containing a selection of material from the aforementioned albums. Both EPs came in plain white jackets with printed graphics on the record label and played at 33⅓ rpm. Both albums were released independently with Remixes using the catalog number BEBOP 001 and Ask DNA using BEBOP 002.

The first EP, simply dubbed Remixes and released in 1999, contains 5 tracks taken from the Music for Freelance CD. Around the label there are trademarks for Sunrise and Victor Entertainment, followed by a line that reads DJ Promo Only Not for Resale. The track list for the EP is below;

The second EP, dubbed Ask DNA and released in 2001, contains all 5 tracks from the Ask DNA maxi-single. This EP was released through the Cowboy Bebop Japanese fanclub as promotional material in limited quantities. It came in a plain white jacket with a sticker on the outside containing the Seatbelts logo and an advertisement for the CD release of Ask DNA. The track list for the EP is below;

The Real Folk Blues Charity Single for COVID-19 Relief 
On May 1, 2020, a charity single of The Real Folk Blues was released by Mason Lieberman and Funimation to raise money for COVID-19 relief. The track features anime, game and music artists including Yoko Kanno and The Seatbelts, A-sha Mai Yamane, and Shihori, with cameos by voice-actors Steve Blum and Beau Billingslea. The single was available as a music video on YouTube, as a stream / download for purchase on Bandcamp and was also a Limited-Edition vinyl with B-side remix. Proceeds were donated to the CDC Foundation and Doctors without Borders.

See also

 Space Bio Charge
 Shakkazombie

References

Further reading
 
 
 
 

Cowboy Bebop
Cowboy Bebop
Japanese jazz
Jazz soundtracks
Victor Entertainment soundtracks